Yashodha Lanka (born 1 October 1992) is a Sri Lankan cricketer. He made his first-class debut for Badureliya Sports Club in the 2010–11 Premier Trophy on 4 April 2011.

References

External links
 

1992 births
Living people
Sri Lankan cricketers
Badureliya Sports Club cricketers
Galle Cricket Club cricketers
Moors Sports Club cricketers
Sportspeople from Galle